Thabo Leinanyane (born 27 July 1993) is a Motswana footballer who currently plays for Jwaneng Galaxy.

References

1993 births
Living people
Botswana footballers
Botswana international footballers
Gilport Lions F.C. players
Jwaneng Galaxy F.C. players
Association football defenders